Rhynocoris iracundus is an assassin and thread-legged bug belonging to the family Reduviidae, subfamily Harpactorinae. The species was first described by Nikolaus Poda von Neuhaus in 1761.

Rhynocoris iracundus differs in colour from R. erythropus in that the sides of the abdomen in R. erythropus are yellow/orange and black, instead of the red and black seen in R. iracundus. In general, the front lobe of the pronotum of R. iracundus is broadly blackened, while in R. rubricus it is red. Furthermore, R. iracundus has narrower red stripes on its legs and abdomen. The base of scutellum is twice as long as the height.

This species is found in many parts of Europe.

References

 Putshkov P.V., Putshkov V.G., 1996 - Family Reduviidae - Catalogue of the Heteroptera of the Palaearctic Region
 Dioli P., 1990 - Rhinocoris iracundus (Poda, 1761) e Rhinocoris rubricus (Germar, 1816). (Insecta, Heteroptera, Reduviidae). Il Naturalista Valtellinese - Atti Mus. civ. St. Nat. Morbegno (SO). 
 Rieger C., 1972 - Zu Rhinocoris Hahn, 1833 (Heteroptera). Dtsch. Ent. Zeitsch. Stuttgart.

External links
 BioLib
 Fauna Europaea
 Meloidae

Reduviidae
Hemiptera of Europe
Insects described in 1761
Taxa named by Nikolaus Poda von Neuhaus